Acacia wilsonii, also known as Wilson's wattle, is a shrub of the genus Acacia and the subgenus Plurinerves that is endemic to a small area of western Australia. It was listed as an endangered species in 2018 according to the Environment Protection and Biodiversity Conservation Act 1999 by Australian authorities and according to Biodiversity Conservation Act 2016 by Western Australian authorities.

Description
Like most species of Acacia it has phyllodes rather than true leaves. When it blooms it produces spherical flower-heads that are golden yellow.

Taxonomy
The species was first formally described by the botanists Richard Sumner Cowan and Bruce Maslin in 1999.
The specific epithet honors Paul G. Wilson who collected the type specimen.

Distribution
It is native to an area in the Wheatbelt and Mid West regions of Western Australia. The range of the species extends from around Eneabba in the north and down to around Badgingarra in the south where it is found growing in sandy or loamy soils usually over laterite and commonly situated on hills or slopes as a part of open heath or mallee woodland communities. It is found to be associated with Eucalyptus suberea, Allocasuarina campestris, Calothamnus quadrifidus, Eucalyptus gittinsii, Eucalyptus eudesmioides, Eucalyptus accedens and Grevillea amplexans.

See also
List of Acacia species

References

wilsonii
Acacias of Western Australia
Taxa named by Bruce Maslin
Plants described in 1999
Taxa named by Richard Sumner Cowan